These are the official results of the Women's discus throw event at the 1994 European Championships in Helsinki, Finland, held at Helsinki Olympic Stadium on 9 and 10 August 1994. There were a total number of 24 participating athletes.

Medalists

Final
Held on 10 August 1994

Qualification
Held on 9 August 1994

Participation
According to an unofficial count, 24 athletes from 17 countries participated in the event.

 (2)
 (1)
 (2)
 (2)
 (1)
 (1)
 (3)
 (1)
 (2)
 (1)
 (1)
 (1)
 (2)
 (1)
 (1)
 (1)
 (1)

See also
 1990 Women's European Championships Discus Throw (Split)
 1992 Women's Olympic Discus Throw (Barcelona)
 1993 Women's World Championships Discus Throw (Stuttgart)
 1995 Women's World Championships Discus Throw (Gothenburg)
 1996 Women's Olympic Discus Throw (Atlanta)
 1997 Women's World Championships Discus Throw (Athens)
 1998 Women's European Championships Discus Throw (Budapest)

References

 Results

Discus throw
Discus throw at the European Athletics Championships
1994 in women's athletics